Ishan Ernesto Arturo Kort (born 1 June 2000) is a professional footballer who plays as a goalkeeper for Tweede Divisie team Jong Sparta Rotterdam. Born in the Netherlands Antilles, he plays for the Suriname national team.

Club career
A former youth academy player of Zeeburgia and Twente, Kort joined Almere City in September 2019. He initially joined under-21 team of the club, which played in Derde Divisie, the fourth tier of football in the Netherlands. He made his debut on 21 September 2019 in a 2–1 league defeat against ODIN '59.

International career
Born in the Netherlands Antilles, Kort was given green light by FIFA to represent Suriname. In March 2021, he received his first call-up to the Suriname national team for World Cup qualifying matches against Cayman Islands and Aruba. He made his international debut on 24 March 2021 in a 3–0 win against Cayman Islands.

In June 2021, Kort was named in Suriname's squad for the 2021 CONCACAF Gold Cup.

Career statistics

International

References

External links
 

2000 births
Living people
Sint Maarten footballers
Surinamese footballers
Suriname international footballers
Dutch footballers
Dutch sportspeople of Surinamese descent
Association football goalkeepers
2021 CONCACAF Gold Cup players